Bacon-wrapped foods are foods that are prepared by being covered in bacon. They may be baked, fried, or grilled. Popular bacon-wrapped dishes include angels on horseback, devils on horseback, and pigs in blankets. Bacon has long been used for barding roasts, especially game birds.

Description
Bacon wrapped food is a style of food preparation, where bacon is wrapped around other ingredients or dishes, and either grilled, fried, or baked.

Many of the wrapped foods, such as livers and asparagus, cook more quickly than bacon itself does, and when preparing such dishes it is thus necessary to part-cook the bacon separately, before wrapping the filling and cooking the complete dish.
Bacon-wrapped foods can include many things including filet mignon, chicken nuggets, pork chops, shrimp, Jucy Lucy, and tenderloin.

Bacon wrapped dishes

Bacon roll-ups
Bacon roll-ups, or simply rolls, are rolls made of bacon with a wide range of fillings from peanut butter, through asparagus, to cheese and chutney.

Angels on horseback

Angels on horseback is a British dish of shucked oysters wrapped with bacon and grilled, and often skewered. It became popular in the Victorian era.

Angels on horseback is a hot appetizer made of oysters wrapped with bacon. In the United Kingdom they can also be a savoury, the final course of a traditional British formal meal. They are somewhat similar to Devils on horseback and the Midwestern version of pigs in a blanket, a traditional dish of the American Midwest. Scallops wrapped in bacon appears to be a variation on this dish.

Strictly speaking angels on horseback (and the original UK form of pigs in a blanket) are an hors d'œuvre, unlike the US variant of pigs in a blanket, which are canapés, since the latter always involve a bread base or wrapping, and angels on horseback are not by necessity served on toast.

Bacon-wrapped scallops
Bacon-wrapped scallops appear in American recipes starting at the turn of the 20th century, sometimes called "pigs in blankets". They became very popular starting in about 1980.

Devils on horseback

Devils on horseback is a British dish of bacon-wrapped prunes. The prunes are stuffed with chutney, wrapped in bacon, and grilled.

Devils on horseback are a hot appetizer or savoury.

Other recipes stuff the prune with cheese, almonds, smoked oysters or other things in place of the mango chutney. Other versions again use liver pieces in place of the prunes.

Pigs in blankets

The British dish popular at Christmas consists of sausages wrapped in bacon and baked.

Rumaki

Rumaki consists of water chestnuts and chicken livers wrapped in bacon. It was introduced at the Tiki-style restaurant Don the Beachcomber in the 1940s.

At state fairs

Bacon-wrapped food is popular at state fairs. In 2013, the California State fair served bacon wrapped hot dogs, bacon-wrapped mushrooms, bacon-wrapped turkey legs, and bacon-wrapped cheesecake. In 2016, the North Carolina State Fair served bacon wrapped grilled cheese. In 2018, the Minnesota State Fair had bacon-wrapped pork belly.

References

Bacon dishes
Food preparation